Ante Milicic ((born 4 April 1974) is an Australian soccer manager and former professional player.

Personal life
The son of Croatian immigrants, Milicic grew up in Strathfield, a suburb in the Inner West of Sydney. Milicic was largely brought up by his father after his mother died when he was 17. At 16, he was selected to train at the Australian Institute of Sport.

Club career
He played for a variety of sides in two stints in the National Soccer League. The first stint was played almost entirely for Sydney United, for whom he played as a junior, and which culminated in playing in their runner-up 1996/97 side. After that season he moved to NAC Breda in the Netherlands, and after 2 seasons there went to Croatia's NK Rijeka, where he was the club's top scorer in 2000/01 with 10 goals. On his return to the NSL in season 2001/02, he rejoined Sydney United for a brief stay, before moving to city rival Sydney Olympic during the same season. He would spend the rest of the season and the next playing there, including scoring the only goal of the 2001/02 Grand Final against Perth Glory. In the final he was awarded the Joe Marston Medal, delivering Sydney Olympic their second NSL title, as well as playing in the runner up side the following season against Perth Glory.

In the last season of the NSL in 2003–04 season, he moved to Parramatta Power, where he would again experience Grand Final defeat against the Perth Glory. After the NSL was disbanded, Milicic played in the Malaysia Super League for Pahang. He score a brace for Pahang in his debut against Perlis. He scored 9 goals for Pahang as their were crowned as the league champions in 2004 season. It was widely felt that with the $1.5 million salary caps imposed on all A-League clubs, Milicic would not be able to be brought back to Australia. However, he joined the Newcastle United Jets, who finished 4th on the A-League ladder in 2005/2006, also joining close friends Labinot Haliti, Ned Zelic.

Ante Milicic was the first player in the A-League to score a Hat-Trick in the game Newcastle Jets v New Zealand Knights on 4 November 2005 in round 11. In May 2006 Ante signed to transfer to rival A-League team Queensland Roar, where he played in 44 matches scoring 11 goals. On 8 December 2007, Milicic had his contract terminated by mutual consent and joining Malaysian Premier League Shahzan Muda FC, citing that "It wasn't quite happening for me at Queensland Roar."

National team statistics

Coaching 
Milicic returned home to his club Sydney United as player/coach for season 2009 and 2010 in the NSW Premier League. It is his first venture as coach and currently boasts a record of 9 wins (8 in Premier League 1 Tiger Turf Cup), 2 Draws and 1 Loss.

He was also called up as an assistant coach to the Australia men's national under-20 soccer team team for the 2009 FIFA U-20 World Cup in Egypt and 2011 Under 20s World Cup in Colombia.

On 18 November 2009, it was announced that he would be joining Jesper Olsen as an assistant coach at new A-League side Melbourne Heart.

After being passed over for the vacant manager position at Melbourne Heart, he joined his close friend Tony Popovic as the inaugural assistant coach of Western Sydney Wanderers FC.

At the end of the 2013–14 A-League season, Milicic joined Ange Postecoglou as assistant coach of Australia's men’s national football team, the Socceroos.

On 18 February 2019, Milicic was announced by the FFA as the interim head coach of the Australia women's national team, the Matildas, managing the Matildas to a round of 16 finish at the 2019 FIFA Women's World Cup. He resigned from this position on 19 July 2020.

On 15 May 2019, Milicic was announced as the inaugural head coach for new A-League club Macarthur FC. He began following his spell with the Matildas.

After two seasons with Macarthur, on 26 April 2022, Milicic informed the club that the 2021–22 season would be his last choosing to return to Croatia for family reasons.

Managerial statistics

Honours 
With Australia:
 OFC Nations Cup: 2004
With Sydney Olympic:
 NSL Championship: 2001–02
With Pahang:
 Malaysia Super League: 2004
With Trinity Grammar 4th XI:
 Cassen Cup- Most Outstanding Opens Team: 2009
Personal honours:
 Joe Marston Medal: 2001–2002 with Sydney Olympic
 Johnny Warren Medal: 2003–2004 with Parramatta Power
 NSL Top Scorer: 2003–2004 with Parramatta Power – 20 goals

References

External links
 Oz Football profile

1974 births
Living people
Soccer players from Sydney
Australian people of Croatian descent
Australian expatriate soccer players
Australia international soccer players
Expatriate footballers in Malaysia
Expatriate footballers in Croatia
A-League Men players
National Soccer League (Australia) players
Croatian Football League players
Eredivisie players
NAC Breda players
Newcastle Jets FC players
HNK Rijeka players
Parramatta Power players
Brisbane Roar FC players
Sydney Olympic FC players
Sydney United 58 FC players
Sri Pahang FC players
Australian expatriate sportspeople in the Netherlands
Australian expatriate sportspeople in Croatia
Expatriate footballers in the Netherlands
Australian Institute of Sport soccer players
Association football forwards
2002 OFC Nations Cup players
2019 FIFA Women's World Cup managers
Australian soccer coaches
Melbourne City FC non-playing staff
Australia women's national soccer team managers
Sydney United 58 FC managers
Australian soccer players